Johan Fourie (born 1 November 1982) is a South African first class cricketer. He was included in the Easterns cricket team squad for the 2015 Africa T20 Cup.

References

External links
 

1982 births
Living people
South African cricketers
Easterns cricketers
Cricketers from Johannesburg